Anders Svensson (born June 9, 1977) is a Swedish sprint canoer who competed in the late 1990s and early 2000s. He won a bronze medal in the K-4 500 m event at the 1997 ICF Canoe Sprint World Championships in Dartmouth.

Svensson also competed in the K-1 500 m event at the 2000 Summer Olympics in Sydney, but was eliminated in the semifinals.

References

Sports-reference.com profile

1977 births
Canoeists at the 2000 Summer Olympics
Living people
Olympic canoeists of Sweden
Swedish male canoeists
ICF Canoe Sprint World Championships medalists in kayak